Life of a Dark Rose is the fourth mixtape by Lil Skies, released on January 10, 2018, by All We Got Entertainment and Atlantic Records. The mixtape debuted at number 23 and peaked at number ten on the US Billboard 200 albums chart. The mixtape features a sole guest appearance from Landon Cube who appears on two of the singles, "Red Roses" and "Nowadays".

Singles
After the release of the single "Red Roses", the track "Lust" from the album, which was produced by CashMoneyAP and Menoh Beats, was released as a promotional single on December 15, 2017. He released the single from the album, "Nowadays", in December 2017 as well. He released a new video for "Nowadays" on December 17, 2017. After releasing "Red Roses" and "Lust" in the latter half of 2017, Lil Skies signed with Atlantic Records.

"Lust" has been certified gold, while "Red Roses" and "Nowadays" have been certified platinum.

The album itself was released on January 10, 2018 with 14 songs and only one guest appearance, from Landon Cube, who appears on two tracks: Nowadays" and "Red Roses".

Critical reception
Pitchfork gave it a score of 6.4/10, with reviewer Evan Rytlewski writing that the lyrics were very simple in meaning or inane, and the music unoriginal. However, it also said the album was an "easygoing 40 minutes of sugary trap and mellow, blissfully hazy vibe music," which used sounds "of the moment without advancing them much." Not assigning it a number rating, Paul Simpson of Allmusic said the release "generally feels easy, relaxed, and uncomplicated, with hazy trap beats accompanied by Skies' straightforward, Auto-Tune-free rapping/singing." Uproxx gave it a positive review, saying in the headline that there was the "polish of a seasoned veteran" on the album, with Lil Skies "mixing in plenty of new school influence with his own smooth, polished delivery." Giving it a score of 3.2 of out 5, HipHopDX praised the tracks "Red Roses" and "Nowadays" as the highlights of the album, and said the rest of the tracks were "eh," even if "polished" with catchy beats and good production.

Commercial performance
Life of a Dark Rose debuted at number 23 on the US Billboard 200, also opening at number 13 on the US Top Rap Albums chart and number 16 on the US Top R&B/Hip-Hop Albums chart. The song "Nowadays" from the album, featuring Landon Cube, reached number 85 on the US Billboard Hot 100 for songs by January 17, 2018. It also reached number 33 on the US Hot R&B/Hip-Hop Songs chart, with the album's song "Red Roses" also on that chart, reaching number 36 by January 17, 2018. Uproxx said that the climbing ranking from the week before in the charts was spiked when he released the music video for "Nowadays.

In January 2018, the album reached the top ten of Billboards Top R&B/Hip-Hop Albums chart, jumping from number 16 to number six in its second week, and reaching six as of January 25, 2018. Billboard wrote about the singles at that point, "Nowadays" was 22 on the Hot R&B/Hip-Hop Songs chart and "Roses" was 28.

On November 9, 2018, the album was certified gold by the Recording Industry Association of America (RIAA) for combined sales and album-equivalent units of over 500,000 units. By December 2018, Life of a Dark Rose had sold 652,000 album-equivalent units in the United States. It was eventually certified Platinum in February 2020.

Track listing

Charts

Weekly charts

Year-end charts

Certifications

References

2018 debut albums
Lil Skies albums